Thomas Hecht (born October 31, 1960 in Baltimore, Maryland) is an American pianist, composer and professor of piano, based at the Yong Siew Toh Conservatory of Music, National University of Singapore where he was appointed founding head of piano studies in 2003.

References

External links
 Personal website
 Koru Artists
 Yong Siew Toh Conservatory, NUS
 Steinway Artist Profile

1960 births
Living people
American classical pianists
American male classical pianists
American music educators
American male composers
20th-century American composers
Peabody Institute faculty
Piano pedagogues
20th-century American pianists
21st-century classical pianists
20th-century American male musicians
21st-century American male musicians
21st-century American pianists